Group A of the EuroBasket Women 2021 took place between 17 and 20 June 2021. The group consisted of Belarus, Slovakia, Spain and Sweden and played its games at the Pavelló Municipal Font de Sant Lluís in Valencia, Spain.

Teams

Standings

Matches
All times are local (UTC+2).

Sweden vs Slovakia

Belarus vs Spain

Slovakia vs Belarus

Spain vs Sweden

Sweden vs Belarus

Spain vs Slovakia

References

External links
Official website

Group A
2020–21 in Belarusian basketball
2020–21 in Slovak basketball
2020–21 in Spanish basketball
2020–21 in Swedish basketball